Mlabbas (Syrian Arabic) (Arabic: ملبس), and Noghl (Iranian Persian), or Nuql (Afghan Persian), or sugar-coated almonds, is a traditional Syrian, Iranian and Afghan confection. It is made by boiling sugar with water and rose water and then coating roasted almonds in the mixture. It can also be made with other nuts such as walnuts or other items.  Noghl is often eaten along with tea.

Noghl is often included in Syrian, Iranian and Afghan weddings, which are based on ancient Arabic / Persian / Afghan ceremonies. As part of the wedding celebration, an often lavish spread of food is prepared at the home of the bride. Included among the food is an assortment of pastries and sweets, including noghl, which is typically paid for by the groom. In many places in both Iran and Afghanistan, Noghl (Nuql) is showered on the bride and groom, much like confetti in Western countries would be.

See also
 Dragée
 List of almond dishes
 Suikerboon
 Chickpea noghl

References 

Sugar confectionery
Syrian cuisine
Iranian desserts
Afghan desserts
Nut confections
Almond desserts